Tudor Sanon (born January 14, 1984) is a male Haitian taekwondo athlete.

Sanon represented Haiti at the 2004 Summer Olympics in Athens, being his national team's flagbearer.

References

External links
 Profile from the 2009 Summer Universiade official site

1984 births
Living people
Haitian male taekwondo practitioners
Taekwondo practitioners at the 2004 Summer Olympics
Taekwondo practitioners at the 2007 Pan American Games
Taekwondo practitioners at the 2011 Pan American Games
Olympic taekwondo practitioners of Haiti
Pan American Games bronze medalists for Haiti
Pan American Games medalists in taekwondo
Medalists at the 2003 Pan American Games
21st-century Haitian people